Łęczna Lake District Landscape Park or Łęczna Lakeland Scenic Park  is a protected area (a Landscape Park) in eastern Poland, established in 1990, covering an area of  in the geographic region called the Łęczna-Włodawa Lakeland (Pojezierze Łęczyńsko-Włodawskie) or the Łęczna-Włodawa Plain (Równina Łęczyńsko-Włodawska).

The Park lies within Lublin Voivodeship: in Lubartów County (Gmina Ostrów Lubelski, Gmina Uścimów) and Łęczna County (Gmina Ludwin, Gmina Puchaczów).

The best known recreational area within the Łęczna Lakeland surrounds the White lake (Jezioro Białe Włodawskie), with the resort town called Okuninka.

See also
 Special Protection Areas in Poland

References 

Landscape parks in Poland
Parks in Lublin Voivodeship